Ghana Oil Company, known as GOIL, is a state-owned Ghanaian oil and gas marketing company, formed on 14 June 1960.  Currently it holds the place of Ghana's top oil marketing company, and is the only indigenous owned petroleum marketing company in Ghana.

History

Founding 
Founded in 1960, GOIL began as a private enterprise named AGIP Ghana Company Limited, with major shareholders AGIP SPA of Italy and SNAM S.P.A. It was initially founded as a company that would produce fossil fuel products such as fuel, propane and butane, asphalt, and lubricants. In 1968 SNAM S.P.A. transferred its shares to Hydrocarbons International Holdings.  In 1976, the name was changed from AGIP Ghana Company Limited to Ghana Oil Company.

Ownership 
In 1974 Ghana bought AGIP SPA's and Hydrocarbons International Holdings’ shares.  In 2007 GOIL's board approved becoming a public company, making the company a state-owned enterprise (SOE).  The state currently owns 51% of GOIL's shares. These shares are held through Social Security and National Insurance Trust (SSNIT), an agency charged with Ghana's pension system.  The SSNIT holds these shares because it has an interest in major aspects of Ghana's economy because it needs sectors to do well in order to insure pensions.

2010–2012 rebranding 
Due to deregulation efforts in 2005 among downstream petroleum companies, GOIL began to lose its market dominance.  In order to address the revenue losses from increased competition, the company embarked on a rebranding strategy that included a new logo and a new slogan of "energy with a smile."   The new logo is meant to represent movement, energy, life, and growth.  They also completed ISO certification, giving both customers and shareholders more confidence in GOIL's products.  More service stations were added as part of the initiative.  Efforts are still being made to further improve customer satisfaction, increased shareholder value.  The rebranding has overall been considered successful, and has kept GOIL as the country's top petroleum marketer.

2015 Explosion 
On 4 June 2015, a GOIL fuel station in Accra exploded. The station had been used as a shelter for victims of the 2015 Accra floods, and the disaster was compounded by floodwaters as gas floated and spread. The death toll was at least 150 people.[5]  In 2018, 69 victims filed a class action lawsuit for GH₵40 million in damages, and GH₵1 million for hospital bills and transportation against the specific GOIL station, the National Petroleum Authority, and Accra's mayor, Alfred Oko Vanderpuije.

ExxonMobil Partnership 
In October 2018, Ghana began asking for bids from domestic and international oil companies to explore offshore oil reserves. In December 2018 it was announced that GOIL, in partnership with ExxonMobil and Ghana National Petroleum Corporation (GNPC) would be entering into deep-water oil exploration in the Cape Three Points area.  This move is supposed to strengthen Ghana's indigenous presence in the petroleum industry, and increase domestic oil production.  For GOIL, engaging in deep-water oil exploration would mean shifting towards being an upstream petroleum company.

Leadership 
Patrick Okorli serves as Goil's chief executive officer, managing director, and executive director since 2012.  Before this position, he has served as chief accountant, controller, treasurer, chief internal auditor, and finance manager.  In 2017, Peter Bartels was promoted to non-executive chairman, which means he does not have a management position in the company, but instead oversees the running of the board.  The Head of Finance is Erasmus Sarkwa, and the Chief Operating Officer is Alex Adzew.

Awards and recognition 
Goil has won numerous awards, including first place in the Ghana Energy Awards for petroleum company of the year in 2001, 2005, 2007, and 2008.  It also consistently places first in Chartered Institute of Marketing Ghana (CIMG) awards for petroleum company of the year.

In 2018, Chairman Peter Bartels was awarded "Outstanding Board Chairman of the year 2018" in Accra's 9th Entrepreneur and Corporate Executive Awards.

In 2019 the company picked up the Chartered Institute of Marketing Ghana (CIMG) Hall of Fame Award in the Elite Category under 10 years.

Operations 
The company's main business is marketing and distribution of petroleum products in Ghana. The biggest chunk of its sales comes from the sale of diesel and gasoline. The company is manned by a 10-member management team headed by the managing director.

Throughout Ghana, GOIL has five regional offices that serve as distribution points in Accra, Tema, Kumasi, Takoradi, and Tamale. However, the main distribution points for fuels are Liaison Office, Central Depot, and the Accra Plains Depot all within the Tema catchment area, and the Takoradi Depot.

GOIL has the largest retail network across Ghana. The company also has numerous consumer outlets throughout Ghana. The consumer outlets include companies, schools, hospitals, factories, hotels, banks and major parastatals. In addition, GOIL has a number of other retail outlets established to market premix fuel and kerosene to rural areas in Ghana. LP Gas filling plants have also been installed at some of the filling and service stations and at other locations in Ghana.

Currently, GOIL's technical partners are ENI SPA (AGIP) of Italy.

See also

List of petroleum companies
Oil reserves in Ghana
Economy of Ghana

References

External links
Ghana Oil Company official homepage
GhanaWeb.com
Ghana Oil Company - 2017 Annual Report & Financial Statements

Oil and gas companies of Ghana
National oil and gas companies
Government-owned companies of Ghana
Energy companies established in 1960
Non-renewable resource companies established in 1960
1960 establishments in Ghana
Companies listed on the Ghana Stock Exchange
Companies based in Accra
Ghanaian brands